The Amityville Horror Part II is a book written by John G. Jones as the sequel to The Amityville Horror. The book was published in 1982 and recounts the aftermath of the original book and what happened to the Lutzes after they fled 112 Ocean Avenue. This was the final book in the series to be based or inspired by a true story. The sequels had the Lutzes as main characters and were marketed as "The Terrifying True Story Continues..." although there is a disclaimer stating that the book did change names and combined two people into one character for the book.

History
In an interview after George and Kathy took lie detector tests, they revealed for the first time to the public that they were still experiencing paranormal problems. At the time they were in the process of writing three books: "The Amityville Horror Picture Book", "Unwanted Company",and a third book "A Force of Magnitude: Amityville II"  which would tell of their continuing ordeal. Two books were never published (Until a few years later with Amityville: The Evil Escapes) but a year later John.G Jones took interest in re-writing "A Force of Magnitude: Amityville II". Jones re-titled the book as "The Amityville Horror Part II".

Plot
The Lutz family barely escapes 112 Ocean Ave. While fleeing Amityville, they are attacked, but get away. They arrive at Kathy's mother's house, where they think they are safe. Soon after, George is awakened by a supernatural force. George and Kathy realize that they are being followed. Over the next few days, Kathy and her mother spot Missy playing with Jodie. Events plague the family. They get The Amityville Horror published and have to deal not only with the supernatural, but with skeptics and a neverending line of press.

Criticisms
This book, like the previous one, was also released as a "true story". It was criticized that much of the story seemed to be fictional. Some have said that the book is an easy work of fiction that feeds off of the success of the original story. The most controversial part of the book is the completely new version of the 28th night.

Changes from the first book
There are numerous changes from what was told in the first book. The final night in the original book was very intense and moved very quickly. In "Amityville II," the ending is re-written and very similar to the film version. In this version, George and Kathy calmly leave the house, with George even going back into the house to grab some pairs of clothes. The biggest film similarity is when the family realizes they almost left Harry behind, causing George to run back to the house (although in the book George runs down the driveway and into the boathouse, while in the film he has to re-enter the house, falling through the stairs and into the well). The night at Kathy's mother's house is also changed greatly. In the original, it is presumed that paranormal activity starts AFTER George and Kathy arrive at her mother's house. In "Amityville II" it begins right after they leave the house. The first night at Kathy's mother's house is also re-written. The epilogue of "The Amityville Horror" is also fictionalized in "Amityville II".

Validity
In numerous interviews, the Lutz family claimed they were followed by what was at the house. Hans Holzer, in his investigation of the property, discovered that the house was allegedly built on an Indian burial ground. He also suggested that Defeo was possessed by the Indian chief only because he wanted him out of the house. Therefore, according to Holzer, the Lutz family was not followed by the ghosts. However, demonologist Lorraine Warren specifically said that the force in the house was not bound there, implying they could have been followed.

The Amityville Horror
1982 novels
American horror novels
1980s horror novels